Panthers Football Club is a British Virgin Islands football club based in Road Town. During the 2015–16 BVIFA National Football League, the Panthers finished third.

Current squad

References

Panthers